Horacio Paul Picerni (December 1, 1922 – January 12, 2011) was an American actor in film and television, perhaps best known today in the role of Federal Agent Lee Hobson, second-in-command to Robert Stack's Eliot Ness, in the ABC hit television series, The Untouchables.

Early years
Picerni was born in New York City to an Italian family. Raised in Corona, Queens, he was an Eagle Scout in his youth and adolescence. After high school, Picerni studied drama at Loyola University.

Military service
Picerni joined the United States Army Air Forces during World War II and served as a B-24 Liberator bombardier in the China-Burma-India Theater. He flew twenty-five combat missions with the 493rd Bomb Squadron of the 7th Bomb Group and received the Distinguished Flying Cross.

He was part of a mission that attacked and destroyed the actual bridge made famous in the film The Bridge on the River Kwai (1957). After the Japanese surrendered, Picerni became a Special Services officer in India. Following his discharge, he enrolled at Loyola Marymount University in Los Angeles.

Film
As a young actor returning from the war, Picerni appeared in military pictures: in Twelve O'Clock High (1949) as a bombardier and as Private Edward P. Rojeck in Breakthrough. This led to a Warner Brothers contract and a succession of roles at that studio including a Portuguese Socialist "Red" agitator in 1952's The Miracle of Our Lady of Fatima and the hero of the 1953 horror classic House of Wax. After his departure from Warners, he appeared with Audie Murphy in Universal Studio's To Hell and Back.

Television

Regular roles

After Italian organizations began to complain about the use of Italian gangsters on ABC's, The Untouchables, starring Robert Stack as G-man Eliot Ness, Picerni joined the cast in 1960 as Ness's number-one aide, Lee Hobson, a role that he played for the duration of the series. (He was also seen in the program's pilot, playing Tony Liguri.) He also portrayed Ed Miller on O'Hara, U.S. Treasury (1971-1972) and was featured as Dan Garrett on The Young Marrieds (1964–66)

Guest appearances
In 1954, Picerni was cast as the outlaw Rube Burrow in the syndicated western television series Stories of the Century, starring and narrated by Jim Davis. That same year, he had a role in the pilot episode for the 1957-58 NBC detective series, Meet McGraw.

Picerni appeared in two episodes, "Gun Hand" and "Badge to Kill" of the syndicated western series 26 Men (1957–59). He also appeared in the episode "Gypsy Boy" of Tales of the Texas Rangers. In 1957, he played a deserter in an episode of the syndicated Boots and Saddles.

Between 1957 and 1960, Picerni was cast three times in different roles, the last as Duke Blaine, on the ABC/Warner Brothers western series, Colt .45, starring Wayde Preston.

In 1958, Picerni played a milkman on the ABC sitcom, The Donna Reed Show. He also portrayed a police detective in the episode "The Quemoy Story" of Behind Closed Doors.

Picerni made three guest appearances on Perry Mason during its nine-year run on CBS. In 1958 he played Charles Gallagher in "The Case of the One-Eyed Witness", and defendant Army Sgt. Joseph Dexter in "The Case of the Sardonic Sergeant". In 1963, he played murderer Walter Jefferies in "The Case of the Bouncing Boomerang". In 1964, he appeared in The Fugitive, in the episode "Search in a Windy City".

In 1967, Paul appeared with his daughter Gina Picerni in the episode "The Chameleon" of My Three Sons.

Book
His autobiography, Steps to Stardom: My Story, written with the help of Tom Weaver, was published by BearManor Media in 2007.

Personal life and death
Picerni married former ballet dancer Marie Mason, in 1947. They settled in Tarzana, California to raise their family; they had eight children and ten grandchildren. Two of Picerni's children predeceased him.

He died from a heart attack in Palmdale, California, on January 12, 2011, at the age of 88. Picerni is interred at the Roman Catholic San Fernando Mission Cemetery.

Filmography

Film

Television

References

External links

 
 
 Conversations at the Cinematheque: Paul Picerni for DRIVE A CROOKED ROAD (interview, April 11, 2010)

1922 births
2011 deaths
American male film actors
American male television actors
Male actors from New York City
American people of Italian descent
People from Greater Los Angeles
Burials at San Fernando Mission Cemetery
People from Palmdale, California
Military personnel from California
United States Army Air Forces pilots of World War II
Recipients of the Distinguished Flying Cross (United States)
United States Army Air Forces officers